Eduard Avtandilovich Tyukin (born May 19, 1978) is a Russian weightlifter who won the bronze medal in the 94 kg class at the 2004 Summer Olympics.

External links
Home site

1978 births
Living people
Russian male weightlifters
Kazakhstani male weightlifters
Weightlifters at the 2004 Summer Olympics
Olympic weightlifters of Russia
Olympic bronze medalists for Russia
Olympic medalists in weightlifting
Medalists at the 2004 Summer Olympics